Kwak Yi-kyong (born 1979) is a South Korean LGBT human rights activist, civil rights activist, and labor rights activist. From 2012 to the present, she has been a representative of Solidarity for LGBT Human Rights of Korea(SLRK).

In her early years, Kwak was involved with student movements. She was Vicechairman of Goryeo University's Students' Union. In 2002, she joined Solidarity for LGBT Human Rights of Korea (SLRK). From 2004 to 2005 Kwak was Secretary General of SLRK.

In 2005, she was appointed to Education responsible of LGBT minorities Committee (성소수자위원회) of the Democratic Labor Party. She was also involved with the labor rights, human rights, AIDS rights, and Anti-war peace movements. In 2011 Kwak was appointed to the LGBT minorities Committee of the Democratic Labor Party. In 2013, she became adjunct policy director of the National Women's Union (전국여성노조).

In 2012, she was operational chairperson (운영위원장) of SLRK. In 2013, she was chairperson of SLRK.

See also 
 Chung Yeol
 LGBT rights in South Korea

References

External links 
 Photo of Kwak Yi-kyong protesting
 Facebook wall of Kwak Yi-kyong
 우리는 거부한다, 편견과 차별과 폭력을! 
 곽이경:동성애자인권연대 운영위원장 

1979 births
South Korean LGBT rights activists
South Korean human rights activists
South Korean humanitarians
South Korean writers
People from Seoul
South Korean columnists
South Korean women writers
South Korean women columnists
South Korean women activists
Living people